The former Central Australia Railway, which was built between 1878 and 1929 and closed in 1980, was a  1067 mm narrow gauge railway between Port Augusta and Alice Springs. A standard gauge line duplicated the southern section from Port Augusta to Maree in 1957 on a new nearby alignment. The entire Central Australia Railway was superseded in 1980 after the standard gauge Tarcoola–Alice Springs Railway was opened, using a new route up to 200 km to the west. A small southern section of the original line between Port Augusta and Quorn has been preserved as the Pichi Richi Tourist Railway.

Naming
Whilst officially the Central Australia Railway, it has been known by a number of names.

Initially the northern end point had not be determined. Government acts and the press used a number of terms prior to construction including

 The Port Augusta Railway
 The Northern Railway
 The Port Augusta to (far) North Railway

After construction, railway was referred to as Port Augusta-Oodnadatta railway before the line was extended towards Alice Springs and it was also referred to as the North-South Railway in possible anticipation to extend the line to Darwin.

It has also often been referred to as the Great Northern Railway in the 1890s and into the twentieth century. The most southern part of the line between Port Augusta and Quorn is now referred to as the Pichi Richi Tourist Railway.

Another colloquial name used was The Ghan, after the passenger train that utilised the line. It is suggested that The 'Ghan name is in recognition of the Afghan Cameleers that plied their trade in the area well before the railway; however, see The Ghan (Etymology) for alternatives. This colloquial term for the railway appears to have been widely in use from at least the early 1930s; it may have been in use prior to this. The new Adelaide–Darwin railway line initially used The New Ghan as a trading name. It has now reverted to The Ghan, relegating the original line name colloquially as The Old Ghan.

History

Proposal 
From the proposal for a line heading north of Port Augusta to turning the first sod in 1878 took 18 years and the process was referred to by the press as "which has so far failed to extend itself out of the region of nebulous ideas.".

The key issues reported at the time were:

Cost benefits 
Significant debate about the cost delayed and eventually altered the final design. The costs were significant for the South Australian colony and there was rigorous debate over that period. Mineral extraction was touted as the key benefit, with farming and passenger traffic being deemed by many as being uneconomic alone although others suggest the key products were 'wool, station stores, and copper' in that order. The cost per kilometre was set in the Acts which precluded more expensive options.

Gauge and minimum speed 
There was fierce debate about the gauge of the line, the maximum weight to be carried and maximum speed as all three dictated the cost.

Route and end point 
A multitude of routes and end-points were nominated with over a dozen potential routes explored, most of these to the north. End points that were discussed included Government Gums (Farina, South Australia (320 km), Yudnamutana, South Australia (390 km) and Beltana (232 km). The 1867 Act stated that the line would be 200 miles from Port Augusta. Newspapers of the time did mention extending the line to Port Darwin although this was not gazetted in Parliament.

State versus corporate 
The State run South Australian Railways wanted to build the line and there were others who thought 'capitalists', predominantly from the United Kingdom, would offer better value for money. South Australian Railways developed a trial called the Northern Extension Railway to Burra to test the engineering capabilities.

Legislation
The following Acts were passed by the parliament of South Australia and, after federation in 1901, the Australian parliament.

Construction 
Design, construction, as well as a hiatus, occurred in four periods distinct under both South Australian and Federal Australian Governments over a fifty-year period.

Initial design and route 
Around 1871, there was general agreement between Robert C. Patteson, Assistant Engineer (report writer), H. C. Mais, (Engineer-in-Chief) and Surveyor General. George Goyder (creator of the Goyder line of rainfall) about the length and route of the railway. All three could not see going further north than Beltana (232 km) due to rain fall and environment, The two options out of Port Augusta were the Western Plains and the Pichi Richi routes. The Pichi Richi route, while more expensive, offered access to the farmland to the west.

An extensive permanent survey was conducted circa 1876 and the final route mapped to Government Gums due to the water available at the terminus. The length was to be "198 miles 66.92 chains", and the route consisted of "no less than 64 bridges, ranging in length from 20 feet to 740 feet, 470 flood-openings from 10 to 40 feet wide, 550 culverts from 2 feet 6 inches to 10 feet wide, 61 pipe-drains,and 14 water courses".

Initial build to Farina (Government Gums) 
The first sod was turned at Port Augusta on 18 January 1878 and took until 1882 to reach Government Gums (320 km), 1884 Maree (372 km), 1888 Coward Springs (501 km) and finally Oodnadatta in 1891 (770 km). Construction was by South Australian Railways as a  narrow gauge railway.

Cessation of extending the line 
Between 1891 and 1926, the railway line was not extended. Discussion occurred about if the existing line should be extended or commence a standard gauge railway from Tarcoola. The South Australian Railways were transferred to the Australian Federal Government on 1 January 1911 however South Australian Railways continued running the service until 1 January 1926. In 1926, Commonwealth Railways took over the running and commenced planning for extending the railway line north.

Completion from Oodnadatta to Alice Springs 

Extending the line from Oodnadatta to Alice Springs commenced around 1926 and was completed on 6 August 1929.

The Northern Territory Act (Cth 1910) required the building of a North-South railway although no date was specified. Two unballasted routes were shortlisted with a standard gauge line from Kingoonya to Alice Springs estimated at 4.5m pounds and the 1.7m pound narrow gauge extension from Oodnadatta to Alice Springs. The 270 miles 65 chain extension was passed after a number of debates in Federal Parliament.

Railway workers were paid 5 pounds, 8 shillings a week and a request for this to be raised to 6 pounds per week was refused by Sir John Quick in the Federal Arbitration Court on 11 March 1927.

The first train consisted of 12 carriages including Mail and Fruit vans. There were 60 first class and 60 second class passengers and left on 5 August 1929 however an official ceremony to be attended by the Prime Minister was cancelled due to the cost of running a special train.

Operations

Conditions
The tortuously curving narrow-gauge line between Marree and Alice Springs was notoriously prone to delays, often caused by flash floods washing away bridges and tracks. Some track was laid on sand without ballast, and wood sleepers were used, serving as food for termites, causing unstable tracks.

Floods
The chosen route for the Central Australian Railway was heavily influenced by the need for water for steam locomotives. Since time immemorial, Aboriginal people had followed a chain of artesian springs and waterholes to sustain them when carrying ochre from the Far North of South Australia to trading places in the south. The explorer John McDouall Stuart followed a similar route during several expeditions between 1858 and 1862. The route taken by the Overland Telegraph ten years later, to which Stuart is believed to have given attention during his travels, was very similar. When the railway route was surveyed, it was hardly surprising that it followed the reliable sources of water. And as a consequence, the railway was intermittently subject to floods on a grand scale that washed away bridges, embankments and other earthworks. A selection during 50 years is in this table:

World War II 
In 1944, it was reported that trains had increased on the line from the normal two a week to 56, whilst the North Australia Railway had increased from one a week to 147. Rolling stock, sidings, marshaling areas and water points for the steam engines were all key issues in increasing traffic on the line.

Diesel locomotives 
The first diesel electric engine commenced service in June 1954. It was one of 14 engines ordered for both the Central and North Australia Railway. Built by the Birmingham Carriage and Wagon company, the engines were designed to haul loads of 330 imperial tons at 50 mph, with a maximum range of 700 miles. The Trans-Australian Railway and this line were the first two lines to be powered by diesel electric engines only in Australia.

Film
Shortly before the closure of the narrow gauge line in 1980, BBC Television filmed an episode of the television series Great Railway Journeys of the World featuring the original route of the Ghan (and the infamously slow speed of the train).

Decline, conversion to standard gauge and closure 
After World War II, the railway line existence became questionable for a number of reasons:

 The railway had a history of extensive flood damage as the original steam engines required access to streams which were prone to floods.
 The track was narrow gauge and not ballasted and thus loads and speeds were both reduced, reducing the profitability of the line.
 Goyder's Line of rainfall (1865), excluding rains in 1865, 1872 and some other years, was shown as being highly accurate with communities and cropping lands north of his line being abandoned after long dry spells. The entire railway is north of this line.
 Trucks and roads were becoming more reliable and utilised in South Australia.
 The 1910 Northern Territory Acceptance Act mandating a railway line between Darwin and Adelaide requiring a standard gauge railway, which would need to be less susceptible to flooding than the existing route designed for diesel-electric engines rather than steam.
 Improved railway engineering and construction methods allowed for improved design.
 The standard gauge upgrade of the southern section of the line from near Port Augusta to Maree placed pressure on the remaining narrow gauge sections that remained opened due to transfer and maintenance costs.

Standard gauge line to Marree
In 1949, both South Australia and the Federal Government enacted the Railway Standardisation (South Australia) Agreement Act which looked at the upgrade of all lines to standard gauge, including the Central Australia Line. The act was more of an overarching statement rather than a commitment to complete all lines in a set order or time.

The Leigh Creek and Telford Cut Coalfields were first excavated in 1943 following a shortage of coal during World War II and between 1951 and 1954, discussions surrounded two route options to upgrade to standard gauge. Option B2 was upgrading the current line to Telford, the C option was the chosen option which was up to 32 km west of the current line. The South Australian and Federal governments bickered over by-passing the township of Quorn and it was only after a Royal Commission, that the Commonwealth Railways got their way with option C avoiding Quorn and the work commenced on the 255 km line.

The South Australian Government and agriculturists wanted to extend the standard gauge line a further 88 km to Marree. This would reduce the bruising of the cattle and shorten the time to market as well as increase the number of cattle that could be transferred. Transferring livestock at Telford was considered problematic with coal dust and machinery.

The federal minister of transport travelled to the area in mid-1954 and confirmed the extension from Telford Cut to Marree. The cost was set at 1,241,000 pounds, compared to 821,000 pounds to bring the existing line up to an acceptable level including ballasting and possible bridge replacement.

The Minister for Transport, Senator George McLeay and the Commonwealth Railways Commissioner, Mr. P. J. Hannaberry, both stated that they were "strongly in favour" to extend the standard gauge line all the way to Alice Springs in 1952. By April 1954, Hannaberry had changed his mind and stated it was "out of the question".

In 1957, the Marree Railway Line, the new standard gauge line from Stirling North (near Port Augusta) to Marree (372 km from Port Augusta) opened, replacing the existing line via Quorn. This was predominantly for coal to be transferred from the Leigh Creek and Telford Cut Coalfields to the power stations at Stirling North. The line was extended to Marree for cattle to be transported to market from the grazing plains, including around the Birdsville Track.

Closures 
With the new standard gauge Marree Railway Line opened, the narrow gauge line began to close in sections:

1957: The section between Brachina (173 km) to Beltana (232 km) is closed in March
1957: The section between Leigh Creek (262 km) to Marree (372 km) is closed in July
1958: Beltana (232 km) to Leigh Creek (262 km) closed in July.
1972: Port Augusta (0 km) to Hawker (105 km) closed.
Some sections of the narrow-gauge line remain in operation as the Pichi Richi Railway and the section from Port Augusta to Stirling North was realigned and restored in 2000–2002.
1981: The entire narrow gauge line was closed with the section between Marree (372 km) and Alice Springs (1243 km) abandoned, replaced by Tarcoola-Alice Springs line standard gauge line.
1987: Standard gauge between Marree and Telford Cut closed.
2016: Stirling North-Telford Cut standard gauge line mothballed after power station and mine closure.

Heritage trail, restoration and preserved sections 
The old railway route is now a heritage trail.

In 1974, the newly formed Pichi Richi Railway Preservation Society commenced a restoration program, headquartered at Quorn at the picturesque southern end of the railway; Stirling North, near Port Augusta, was the other terminus. It progressively restored and operated the Pichi Richi Railway as a working museum, upgrading track and undertaking preservation of a wide range of South Australian Railways rolling stock and some locomotives, secured against deterioration in the former running sheds. Between 2000 and 2002, the line was extended 12 km (7 mi) to Port Augusta station, running alongside the standard gauge mainline for about half the distance.

In May 2016, traffic ceased on the standard gauge line between Telford Cut coal mine and Port Augusta after the power station at Port Paterson was shut down.

The Farina Restoration Project Group, whose members travel to the former town at agreed periods to work voluntarily, is restoring the small, now-deserted railway township of Farina.

List of stations, stopping places and localities

See also

Adelaide–Darwin railway line
Marree railway line
North Australia Railway
Pichi Richi Railway
The Ghan

Notes

References

Further reading

External links
Photo album of images along the line
History of the Adelaide-Darwin Railway
Tarcoola to Alice Springs Railway Act 1974
Weekend Extra film on the last original Ghan Australian Broadcasting Corporation 1980

Adelaide-Darwin railway corridor
Railway lines closed in 1976
Closed railway lines in South Australia
Closed railway lines in the Northern Territory
3 ft 6 in gauge railways in Australia